2006–07 Eerste Klasse was a Dutch association football season of the Eerste Klasse.

Saturday champions were:
 A: Zwaluwen '30
 B: BVV Barendrecht
 C: LRC Leerdam
 D: VV DOVO
 E: PKC '83

Sunday champions were:
 A: AFC DWS
 B: Westlandia
 C: VV DESK
 D: SV Deurne
 E: De Bataven
 F: SVBO

Eerste Klasse seasons
4